Flames of the Flesh is a 1920 American silent drama film directed by Edward LeSaint, and starring Gladys Brockwell, William Scott, Harry Spingler, Ben Deeley, Charles K. French, Louis Fitzroy, and Rosita Marstini. The film was released by Fox Film Corporation on January 1920.

Cast
Gladys Brockwell as Candace
William Scott as Bruce Eastcoat
Harry Spingler as Charles Eastcoat
Ben Deeley as Craig Boardman
Charles K. French as Simon Eastcoat
Louis Fitzroy as Eastcoat's Secretary
Rosita Marstini as Suzette De Pouges
Josephine Crowell as Madame Binnat
Nigel De Brulier as Henri Leland
Louise Emmons as Undetermined Role (uncredited)

Preservation
The film is now considered lost.

See also
1937 Fox vault fire

References

External links

1920 drama films
Fox Film films
Silent American drama films
1920 films
American silent feature films
American black-and-white films
Lost American films
1920 lost films
Lost drama films
Films directed by Edward LeSaint
1920s American films